The Hundred of Coombe is a Hundred of the County of Cardwell (South Australia) centred on the bounded rural locality of  Colebatch, South Australia near the town of Tintinara, South Australia  in the Murray Mallee region of South Australia.

References

Coombe